Robert Allan Monroe  (October 30, 1915 – March 17, 1995) was a radio broadcasting executive who became known for his research into altered consciousness and for founding The Monroe Institute. His 1971 book Journeys Out of the Body is credited with popularizing the term "out-of-body experience".

Assisted by specialists in psychology, medicine, biochemistry, psychiatry, electrical engineering, physics, and education, Monroe developed Hemi-Sync, a patented audio technology that is claimed to facilitate enhanced performance.

He is also notable as one of the founders of the Jefferson Cable Corporation, the first cable company to cover central Virginia.

Biography
Robert Allan Monroe was born, severely underweight at just two pounds, in 1915 in Indiana. He grew up in Lexington, Kentucky, and Columbus, Ohio; his mother, Georgia Helen Jordan Monroe, was a non-practicing medical doctor and cellist and piano player. His father, Robert Emmett Monroe, was a college professor of Romance Languages who led summer tours to Europe. Monroe had two older sisters, Dorothy and Peggy, and a younger brother, Emmett, who became a medical doctor.

According to his third book Ultimate Journey, he dropped out of Ohio State University in his sophomore year due to a hospital stay for a facial burn that caused him to fall behind in his studies. During almost a year away from college, a desire to find work led him to become a hobo who rode freight trains. He returned to Ohio State to graduate after having studied pre-med, English, engineering, and journalism.

He had an early fascination with flying and music and had great mechanical aptitude. He displayed some ability to read music by age four without having studied the subject, perhaps by listening to his mother and sisters playing piano.

He married Jeanette, a graduate student and daughter of a lawyer, in 1937, and divorced her in 1938 or 1939. He married Mary Ashworth, a divorcee with a daughter Maria, in 1950 or 1951. They had Bob's only biological child together, daughter Laurie. They divorced in 1968. He then married Nancy Penn Honeycutt, a divorcee with four children. They remained married until her death from breast cancer on August 15, 1992.

Monroe developed ulcers in young adulthood and so was classified 4F (unfit for service) during World War II. He spent the war years working for a manufacturing company that designed a flight-simulator prototype. He wrote for an aviation column in Argosy magazine and was given a job with the National Aeronautic Association (NAA), for whom he produced a weekly radio show called "Scramble!", the primary purpose of which was to interest youth in aviation.

In 1953 Mr. Monroe formed RAM Enterprises, a corporation that produced network radio programs, as many as 28 programs monthly, principally in dramatic and popular quiz shows.

In 1956 the firm created a Research and Development division to study the effects of various sound patterns on human consciousness, including the sleep state. Monroe was especially attracted to the concept of sleep-learning. This was a natural direction to take, applying to this new area the audio production methods used in the firm's commercial activity. The purpose was to find more constructive uses for such knowledge than was ordinarily available, and the results of this research have become internationally known.

First out-of-body experiences

According to his own account, while experimenting with sleep-learning in 1958 Monroe experienced an unusual phenomenon, which he described as sensations of paralysis and vibration accompanied by a bright light that appeared to be shining on him from a shallow angle. Monroe went on to say that this occurred another nine times over the next six weeks, culminating in his first out-of-body experience (OBE). Monroe recorded his account in his 1971 book Journeys Out of the Body and went on to become a prominent researcher in the field of human consciousness. Monroe later authored two more books on his experiments with OBE, Far Journeys (1985) and Ultimate Journey (1994).

The Monroe Institute

In 1962 the company moved to Virginia, and a few years later changed the corporate name to Monroe Industries. In this location it became active in radio station ownership, cable television, and later in the production and sale of audio cassettes. These cassettes were practical expressions of the discoveries made in the earlier and ongoing corporate research program.

In 1985 the company officially changed its name, once again, to Interstate Industries, Inc. This reflected Monroe's analogy of how the use of Hemi-Sync serves as a ramp from the "local road" to the "interstate" in allowing people to go "full steam ahead" in the exploration of consciousness, avoiding all of the stops and starts.

The research subsidiary was divested and established as an independent non-profit organization, The Monroe Institute, later in 1985. Interstate Industries, Inc. remains a privately held company, now doing business as Monroe Products.

Monroe's leadership of the entire program of development was supported for more than 50 years by many specialists who continue their participation to this day. His daughter, Laurie Monroe, continued her father's research into consciousness and the mind's potential until her death in 2006. Under the current direction of another of Monroe's daughters, Maria Monroe Whitehead, Monroe's stepson, A. J. Honeycutt, and Teresa West, president of Monroe Products, the company's objective is to continue to expand the Hemi-Sync line of products and their benefits into markets worldwide.

The Monroe Institute (TMI) is a nonprofit education and research organization devoted to the exploration of human consciousness, based in Faber, Virginia, United States. Upwards of 20,000 people are estimated to have attended TMI's residential Gateway program during its first thirty years, with consumers of the audio industry founded on its research running into millions. Currently, many tens of thousands of people have experienced the residential programs developed by the Monroe Institute at TMI's campus in Virginia as well as across the US and the world, including Australia, Brazil, Canada, Cyprus, the UK, France, Germany, Japan, Romania, and Spain. TMI claims a policy of no dogma or bias with respect to belief system, religion, political or social stance.

Monroe founded TMI after he started having what he called "out of body experiences", now also commonly referred to as OBEs. One of its activities includes teaching various techniques, based on audio-guidance processes, in order to expand consciousness and explore areas of consciousness not normally available in the waking state.

In 1978, the U.S. military evaluated TMI and arranged to send officers there for OBE training.  In 1983, it sent additional officers.

Research

Controlled studies of the Institute's technology suggest that it is effective as an analgesic supplement and can reduce hospital discharge times.  The Institute has an affiliated professional membership, and also publishes scientific papers on a subset of its own studies of altered states of consciousness.  In its in-house laboratory, these states or focus levels are typically induced by delivering Hemi-Sync signals to subjects performing relaxation procedures inside a shielded, sense-depriving isolation tank.  Progression through states is detected and monitored by measurement of peripheral skin temperature, galvanic skin response and DC skin potential voltage.

Coverage
In 1994, a front-page article in The Wall Street Journal reported confirmation from the former director of the Intelligence and Security Command of the U.S. Army sending personnel to the institute.  It also stated the opinion of the head of the Zen Buddhist temple in Vancouver British Columbia that "Gateway students can reach meditation states in a week that took [me] 30 years of sitting".

A reporter for The Hook, weekly newspaper for Charlottesville, Virginia, who visited The Monroe Institute said, "...with a few exceptions, the only 'normal' people with whom I could fully identify were the trainers, who seemed remarkably well-grounded for people whose day-to-day experiences include astral projection and disembodied spirits".

The reporter also concluded that "there is something significant being developed at the Institute. Whether it's just a brilliant guided meditation complete with trance-inducing stereoscopic sound, or a doorway to a world of spirit entities, I cannot say".

Hemi-Sync

In 1975, Monroe registered the first of several patents concerning audio techniques designed to stimulate brain functions until the left and right hemispheres became synchronized. Monroe held that this state, dubbed Hemi-Sync (hemispherical synchronization), could be used to promote mental well-being or to trigger an altered state of consciousness. Monroe's concept was based on an earlier hypothesis known as binaural beats and has since been expanded upon a commercial basis by the self-help industry.

Hemi-Sync is a trademarked brand name for a patented process used to create audio patterns containing binaural beats, which are commercialized in the form of audio CDs. Interstate Industries Inc., created by Hemi-Sync founder Robert Monroe, is the owner of the Hemi-Sync technology.  
    
Hemi-Sync is short for Hemispheric Synchronization, also known as brainwave synchronization. Monroe indicated that the technique synchronizes the two hemispheres of one's brain, thereby creating a 'frequency-following response' designed to evoke certain effects. Hemi-Sync has been used for many purposes, including relaxation and sleep induction, learning and memory aids, helping those with physical and mental difficulties, and reaching altered states of consciousness through the use of sound.
    
The technique involves using sound waves to entrain brain waves. Wearing headphones, Monroe claimed that brains respond by producing a third sound (called binaural beats) that encouraged various brainwave activity changes. In 2002, a University of Virginia presentation at the Society for Psychophysiologial Research examined Monroe's claim. The presentation demonstrated that EEG changes did not occur when the standard electromagnetic headphones of Monroe's setup were replaced by air conduction headphones, which were connected to a remote transducer by rubber tubes. This suggests that the basis for the entrainment effects is electromagnetic rather than acoustical.

Replicated, double-blind, randomized trials on anesthetized patients have found Hemi-Sync effective as a partial replacement for fentanyl during surgery. A similar study found it ineffective at replacing propofol, however.

Bibliography

See also
 Astral projection
 Altered state of consciousness
 Binaural beats
 Brainwave entrainment
 Brainwave synchronization
 Dissociation 
 Electroencephalography
 Event-related potential
 Evoked potential
 Human enhancement
 Induced activity
 Institut suisse des sciences noétiques
 Intelligence amplification
 Lucid dreaming
 Mind machine
 Neural oscillations
 Neurofeedback
 Ongoing brain activity
 Out-of-body experience
 Parapsychology

References

External links
Hemi-Sync Website and other Monroe Products
The Monroe Institute
Monroe biography
The Monroe Institute Official YouTube Channel
 Focus 10: Mind Awake/Body Asleep
 TMI's Exploration 27 and the Healing/Regeneration Center Chapter 4
 Monroe Institute Research Papers
 Similar and/or related technologies
 Binaural Beat and Hemi-Sync Brainwave Entrainment

1915 births
1995 deaths
Consciousness studies
New Age writers
Non-profit organizations based in Faber, Virginia
Parapsychologists
Remote sensing research institutes
Spiritual writers
Writers from Columbus, Ohio
Writers from Indiana
Writers from Lexington, Kentucky
Writers from Virginia